Spit may refer to:

Common uses
 Spit (archaeology), a term for a unit of archaeological excavation
 Spit (landform), a section of land that extends into a body of water
 Spit or rotisserie, a rotating device used for cooking by roasting over an open fire
 Spit, another word for saliva
 Spitting, the act of forcibly expelling saliva from the mouth

Places

Antarctica
 Spit Point (Greenwich Island)

Australia
 Spit Bay, Heard Island
 Spit Bridge, Sydney, NSW
 Spit Nature Conservation Reserve, Victoria
 Spit Point, Heard Island

Canada
 Spit Island, Nunavut

People
 Michal Špit (born 1975), a Czech footballer

Arts, entertainment, and media

Music
 Spit (album), the first album by all-female metal band Kittie
 "Spit", a song by American rock band KISS from Revenge
 "Spit", a song by Brazilian metal band Sepultura from Roots
 "Spit", a song by NY Loose from The Crow: City of Angels (soundtrack)
 Spit, another word for rapping

Other uses in arts, entertainment, and media
 Spit (card game)
 Spit the dog, puppet sidekick of entertainer Bob Carolgees
 S.P.I.T.: Squeegee Punks in Traffic, a Canadian 2001 documentary film by Daniel Cross
 Spit! (comics), a British adult comic

Other uses
 Spit (nightclub), in Levittown, New York
 Spit (VoIP spam), an unsolicited telephone call made using IP telephony
 Spit hood, restraint device

See also 
 Spits (newspaper), a Dutch newspaper
 Spitting Image (disambiguation)
 Spitz (disambiguation)
 The Spit (disambiguation)
 The Spits, a Seattle-based band